4/13 is the 12th studio album recorded by the Puerto Rican singer Olga Tañón, released on November 10, 2009.

Background
The album contains songs that the artist had previously released in digital format. The songs are: "Amore Entre Tres" and "Pasión Morena", which were launched simultaneously.  It also contains a DVD which includes medleys of some of her classics.  The album is presented under the label Zamora Music Group, although it is manufactured and distributed by Sony Music Latin.  "Amore Entre Tres" came to occupy its space on several Latin music stations. "Amor Entre Tres" was also featured as the theme song for a Venezuelan telenovela called " La Vida Entera".

Meanwhile, "Pasión Morena" was chosen as the soundtrack for a drama project for TV Azteca-Mexico of the same name. "Pasión Morena", composed by Jose Luis Morin and Olga Tanon, is about making a claim to freedom of people and their struggle to live life to its fullest.  The new line of clothing from the Puerto Rican singer also goes by the name "Pasion Morena". "Navidad Boricua", is another new song that is included in the album. The cut is a duet with Victoria Sanabria who serves as the exclusive artist.

Critical reception

Track listing

References

2009 albums
Olga Tañón albums
Spanish-language albums